Areekode is a  town on the banks of the Chaliyar River in Areekode Grama Panchayat in Malappuram district India. Areekode was part of the Malabar district in British India.

It is a town on the banks of Chaliyar River with an area of 7.25 square miles, Areekode is one of the highly literate areas in the state of Kerala. Situated in the Northern part of Malappuram district, it is encircled by hills and hillocks capped in green. The Areekode region includes  Urangatiri, Kizhuparamba, Kavanoor and Areekode panchayats

It is 17 km from Manjeri, 27 km from Malappuram, and 35 km from Calicut town.

Etymology

It is believed that the name 'Areekode' was derived from 'Aruvikkode', which in Malayalam means 'riverside'. The town is easily accessible by public road transportation.

Another narrative is that 'Areekode' was derived from 'Arikoda', meaning 'where we get rice', referring to the local market(ചന്ത in Malayalam) which was active once in a week.

History

The Kurumathur inscription found near Areekode dates back to 871 CE.

Transportation

Areekode connects to other parts of India through Calicut town on the west, Nilambur town on the east, and Manjeri town on the south. It is only 35 km away from Calicut Town. National Highway 66 passes through Calicut and the northern stretch connects to Goa and Mumbai. The southern stretch connects to Cochin and Trivandrum. State Highway 28 starts from Nilambur and connects to Ooty, Mysore, and Bangalore through Highways 12, 29 and 181.

The nearest airport is at Karipur CCJ.
Karipur Airport (CCJ - Calicut airport) is 30 minutes away from Areekode. 

The nearest major railway station is at Calicut CLT.

Important landmarks

 250KV Power Grid
 VKM HYPER MARKET
 Chekkunnu Mala
 Govt. HSS Areacode, Ugrapuram
 WELLTOP (KINARADAPPAN)
 Kadungalloor Bridge
 Kolamkolli Waterfalls Thachamparamba
 Kurumathur Sree Vishnu Temple
 Malabar Special Police Camp
 Methalangadi Juma Masjid
 Nadukkavungl Sree Mahadeva Temple
 Odakkayam Waterfalls
 Pavanna Hanging Bridge
 Puthalam Sunni Masjid
 Police Station
 Sree Bhadrakali Temple, South Puthalam
 Sree Saligrama Temple, Puthalam
 Synthetic Football stadium
 Thachamparamba Mini Stadium
 Thazhathangadi Juma Masjid
 Therattammel ground
 Maithra bridge
New ALFA Traders rubber dealer

Educational institutions

 Vivid PSC Academy
 Vivid ARMY Academy
 Co-operative College
 Eminent Academy
 Govt. HSS Areacode
 Govt. ITI Areacode
 Govt. LPS Thachanna
 Madar Women's Academy
 Majmau Da'wa College
 Majmau English School
 Mices Public School
 PG Academy
 SS HSS Moorkanad
 Sullamussalam Arabic college
 Sullamussalam Oriental HSS Areacode
 Sullamussalam Private ITI
 Sullamussalam Science college
 Sullamussalam Training College

Hospitals
 Government Taluk Hospital
 Aster Mother Areekode
 Alnas Hospital

 Melepurakkal Hospital

Banking Services
 SBI Areekode
 SIB Areekode
 CSB Areekode
 KGB Areekode
 Canara Bank
 Federal Bank

 Areacode Co-operative Bank

 Malappuram District Co-operative Bank
 Manjeri Co-operative Urban Bank

 HDFC BANK

Travel Agency
 Akbar Travels
 Alhind Tours and Travels
 Enwaytrip Holidays
 Eranad Tourism
 Fida Tours and Travels
 Good Hope Enterprises
 Lofty Holidays
 Naila Travels Pvt Ltd
 Pravasi Tours and Travels

Suburbs of Areekode
On Mukkam Road
 Pathanapuram, Kuttooli, Valillapuzha.

On Othayi Road
 Pathanapuram,
Therattammal, Moorkkanad, Thachanna, Choolattippara
 Kallarattikkal, Thachamparamba
 Maithra , Kuthuparamba

On Edavanna Route
 South Puthalam, Vaakaloor, Vadasseri, Pottiyil, Pannippara, Palepetta

On Kondotty Route
 Muthuvalloor, Kadungalloor, Kizhisseri, Chemrakkattoor, Pookkattuchola, Kozhakottur, Puthalam

On Vazhakkad Route
 Ugrapuram, Poonkudi and Vavoor
 Edasserikkadavu and Kizhuparamba
 Vettupara, Edavannappara

On Thottumukkam Road
 East Vadakkumuri, Vadakkumuri, Kinaradappan, Vettilappara, Odakkayam

See also
 Eranad (State Assembly constituency)
 Eranad
 Omanoor
 Randu Thara Achanmar

References

External links

 
 www.facebook.com/areekode 1reekode on Facebook

Cities and towns in Malappuram district
Kondotty area
Populated waterside places in India